Vráž is a municipality and village in Beroun District in the Central Bohemian Region of the Czech Republic. It has about 1,200 inhabitants.

Geography
It lies mostly in the Hořovice Uplands, the southern part of the municipal territory extends into the Křivoklát Highlands.

History
The first written mention of Vráž is from 1320. From 1357 at the latest, the village was part of the Karlštejn estate and shared its owners and destiny. In 1421, Vráž suffered from the Hussite Wars. In 1639, during the Thirty Years' War, Vráž was burned down by the Swedish army and only few inhabiants remained, but the village recovered.

Transport
The D5 motorway from Prague to Plzeň passes through the municipality.

Sights
The landmark of Vráž is the Church of Saint Bartholomew. It is a Gothic church from the first half of the 14th century, modified in 1909–1910.

References

External links

Villages in the Beroun District